Gentleman and Ladies is a novel by English author Susan Hill, published in 1968, runner-up for the John Llewellyn Rhys Prize. It is notable in exploring themes of death, mental health, and elderly well-being, despite Hill's relative youth at the time of writing.

Plot reception
The story begins at a funeral in the village of Haverstock and ends at a wedding. A stranger appears at the funeral of Faith Lavender, holding stolen snowdrops. Faith's two sisters and neighbours are perplexed by the man, and soon 'undercurrents of fierce emotion, that until now have been suppressed, reach the surface while the tensions rise'.

Reception
In The New York Times, Hill's style is "Briskly impressionistic is better than its substance. Bits and pieces of life among these English senior citizens are sharply illuminated, but the book as a whole has the texture of a soap opera".

Adaptation
BBC Radio 4 produced an adaptation of a radio play in January 1993 featuring Patricia Hayes, Stephanie Cole, Sian Phillips, Gwen Watford and Anna Cropper.

References

Novels by Susan Hill
1968 British novels
Hamish Hamilton books
Novels set in Warwickshire
Works about old age